Red Rodney Returns is an album by trumpeter Red Rodney which was recorded in 1959 and released on the Argo label.

Track listing
All compositions by Danny Kent except where noted.
 "Shaw 'Nuff" (Ray Brown, Gil Fuller, Dizzy Gillespie) – 6:36
 "Red, Hot and Blue" – 6:05
 "I Remember You" (Victor Schertzinger, Johnny Mercer) – 6:07	
 "5709" (Kent) – 4:23
 "Whirlwind" – 5:43
 "Jordu" (Duke Jordan) – 6:12
 "Shelley" – 5:30
 "Two by Two" (Jay Cave) – 4:28

Personnel
Red Rodney - trumpet
Billy Root – tenor saxophone
Danny Kent – piano
Jay Cave – double bass
Frank Young – drums

References

Argo Records albums
Red Rodney albums
1959 albums